Šolta is an island in Croatia. It is situated in the Adriatic Sea in the central Dalmatian archipelago, west of the island of Brač, south of Split (separated by Split Channel) and east of the Drvenik islands, Drvenik Mali and Drvenik Veli (separated by the Šolta Channel). The main settlement is Grohote. Its area is 58.98 km2. and it has a population of 1,700.

Island morphology
The highest peak of Šolta is the summit Vela Straža which is 236 metres high. On the north-eastern coast of the island there are the large bays of Rogač and Nečujam.

Economy
The economy of the island is based on vineyards, olives, fruit, fishing and tourism. While the main settlements (Grohote, Gornje Selo, Srednje Selo, Donje Selo) are inland, the main fishing centres are Maslinica, which is exposed to only north-westerly winds, making it a good shelter for smaller boats. Rogač is the main port and Nečujam the centre of the island's tourism.

Viticulture - Dobričic ancestor of Zinfandel
Viticulture exists on the island since antiquity. The most famous autochthonous red wine variety is the Dobričić. According to DNA analysis, this variety is one of the original varieties of the American Zinfandel along with the Kaštelanski from the Split area. The American wine pioneer Mike Grgich from Croatia brought the varieties to California. The Split noble family of the father of Croatian literature, Marko Marulić (1450-1524), who also lived on Šolta, were among the first to cultivate the Dobričic intensively. In the 19th century viticulture in Šolta suffered severe setbacks. A trade agreement between Austria and Hungary with Italy allowed low-cost Italian wines to be imported duty-free. Diseases such as downy mildew and phylloxera reduced the stocks. The best qualities of national importance were created in the 1870s and 80s by Pietro degli Alberti from Porto Oliveto di Solta (Maslinica). At the Vienna World Fair in 1873 he received an honorary prize. At the Triester exhibition in 1882 he received a gold medal. Even in the interwar period there was intensive viticulture. As a result of the communist economy there is still no larger winery. The cultivation is almost only for the own use. Some smaller wine growers, e.g. in Donje Selo, sell wine directly. It is also available at the market in Grohote. A large vineyard (on state leasehold land) was laid out for the first time again around 2015 on a hill on the road to Maslinica.

History
During the time of the Austro-Hungarian Empire the villages still have their Italian names. Villa Grohote, Villa Inf. short for Villa Inferior (Donje Selo) with the harbor Porto Olivetto (Maslinica), Villa Media (Srednje Selo) and Villa Superior (Gornje Selo) with the harbor Stomosca (Stomorska). The property tax structure of the Austrian-Hungarian administration was based on "Fractionen". The local parish of Šolta was divided into the cadastral community Grohote, Donje-Selo, Gornje-Selo and Srednje-Selo, i.e. under the Croatian place names. However, Šolta was no longer fully recorded in the land register by the Austrian administration. For parts of the island there is only the cadastre, i.e. site plans of the real estate, in which ownership and usage rights are not directly registered. This makes real estate transactions sometimes difficult. As a result of the communist economy there is still no larger winery. They are cultivated almost exclusively for their own needs. In Donje Selo, for example, wine can be bought directly from some smaller winegrowers. It is also available at the market in Grohote. A large vineyard (on state leasehold land) was laid out for the first time again around 2015 on a hill on the road to Maslinica.

The Telegraph arrived late at Šolta. In 1874, the k.k. State telegraph station Grohote handed over to the operation at "limited daily services". That was at the same time as in other smaller places of the monarchy as for example in the Carinthian Sankt Paul im Lavanttal or in Pontafel Pontafel.

In April 1941, Solta came under Axis occupation, first by Italy. Nazi Germany took over after the September 1943 Armistice. In March and April 1944, Solta was the site of two British-American commando raids ten days apart which took many Nazi prisoners and destroyed numerous installations.

Image gallery

References

External links 

 Report about Šolta
 
  (Official page of Šolta)

 
Municipalities of Croatia
Islands of Croatia
Islands of the Adriatic Sea
Landforms of Split-Dalmatia County